Honau may refer to:

Honau Abbey, a former monastery in Northern Alsace, France, which flourished from the 8th century until 1290
Honau, Lichtenstein, a former municipality, currently part of Lichtenstein, Baden-Württemberg, Germany
Honau, Rheinau, a former municipality, currently part of Rheinau, Baden-Württemberg, Germany
Honau, Switzerland, a municipality in Lucerne, Switzerland